is the trust banking arm of Mizuho Financial Group.

History
The merger of the Dai-Ichi Kangyo Bank, Fuji Bank and the Industrial Bank of Japan in 2000 was followed by the merger of their respective trust banking subsidiaries, creating Mizuho Trust & Banking Co. The company is known for developing trust products for specific types of families, including those in the LGBT community. Its main activities include asset management for individuals, securitization, private banking, and custody. Mizuho Trust & Banking also has administration services for a variety of trust, including money trusts, pecuniary trusts, investment trusts, and securities trusts. Its pension activities include corporate pension design planning, the management of pension policy holders, and pension scheme review. Additionally, they design compensation plans for senior executives and other employee retirement benefits. The company is a 100% wholly owned subsidiary of the Mizuho Financial Group.

See also
 Mizuho Bank
 Mizuho Corporate Bank

References

External links
 Mizuho Trust & Banking Co.
  Mizuho Trust & Banking Co.

Financial services companies based in Tokyo
Banks of Japan
Trust and Banking Co., Mizuho
Fuyo Group
Trust banks of Japan